Kani Gol may refer to:
 Kani Gol-e Olya
 Kani Gol-e Sofla